Harchegan (also Romanized as Harchegān) is a village in Howmeh Rural District of the Central District of Shahrekord County, Chaharmahal and Bakhtiari province, Iran. At the 2006 census, its population was 2,273 in 516 households. The following census in 2011 counted 2,114 people in 560 households. The latest census in 2016 showed a population of 1,996 people in 584 households; it was the largest village in its rural district. The village is populated by Turkic people.

References 

Shahrekord County

Populated places in Chaharmahal and Bakhtiari Province

Populated places in Shahr-e Kord County